Pégase Express is a steel family launched roller coaster at Parc Astérix in Plailly, France. The coaster opened to the public on June 11, 2017. It travels both forwards and backwards throughout the layout.

History
Early word of the project first began in December 2014, two years after the park had opened the OzIris inverted coaster (2012), when park director Pascal Fliche told French television during an interview that they were looking into installing a large-scale roller coaster for the 2017 season. A year later, in December 2015, a public survey was launched by park operator Compagnie des Alpes on the website Loisirs Lab asking for a preference of one of three options being considered as a future project. The three projects listed were; Crocos, an Egyptian-themed Zamperla top spin; Le Vol de Thor, a Norse-themed Bolliger & Mabillard Flying roller coaster, and Pégase Express, a large Ancient Greece-themed Gerstlauer family coaster with similarities to the smash hit FireChaser Express at Dollywood. Ultimately, the latter project was the most favored, and plans moved ahead with such.

Site preparation began in March 2016 in the Grèce Antique (Ancient Greece) section of the park, all but confirming that the Pégase Express concept was moving forwards, and track intended for the project was spotted at the Gerstlauer manufacturing plant in April. The coaster was officially confirmed by the park on July 4, 2016, and further details were released. Construction carried on through the fall and winter of 2016-2017, and the layout was completed around February-March 2017. Testing commenced in April 2017, while landscaping and station work wrapped up. More than 20 companies and firms worked to design, develop, and construct the attraction.

A media preview event was held for the Pégase Express on June 10, 2017, and the attraction officially opened to the public the following day, on June 11, 2017.

Characteristics

Statistics
Around one third (1/3) of the listed length is traveled backwards. The ride also has a pair of drive tire launches, the first of which launches the train forwards and the other backwards, although these do not gain significant speed and are not seen as the primary ride lift mechanisms.

Pégase Express runs 4 trains, each consisting of 10 cars that seat a pair of riders in a single row, accounting for an estimated total capacity of 1,200 riders per hour.

Model
Pégase Express was manufactured by Germany firm Gerstlauer, and is one of their Family Coaster models. The ride's main source of reference was the FireChaser Express coaster at Dollywood in Pigeon Forge, Tennessee, another Gerstlauer coaster that had opened in 2014 with considerable theming and features several similarities to the Pégase Express.

Theme
The theme, like the rest of the park, draws heavily from the Asterix universe, and references to such can be found throughout the queue. The attraction is themed as a transportation service, where the trains are pulled at high speeds thanks by the winged horse Pegasus, with the queue and station located in the fictional Gare Montparnassos train station. The station's name is a reference to both the actual Parisian train station as well as the Mount Parnassus mountain in Greece. The queue is filled with various posters and station elements mimicking those of modern-day travel, with headlines and ticket booths referring to real life situations such as common commuter struggles, a railway worker's strike, and an upcoming tunnel to Londinium. A  statue of Pegasus also adorns the entrance to the ride.

Pégase Express's theme and architecture was designed by Dutch design firm Jora Vision in close collaboration with the park. The ride's Projection mapping scene in Medusa's temple mid-ride was created by Belgian creative studio b71.

Ride experience
Once passengers have boarded, the coaster train is propelled out of the station by a drive tire launch and into a downwards 270° right-hand helix. At the top, riders make a slight left turn before descending the coaster's main drop, proceeding to crest a flat camelback hill that crosses over the Romus et Rapidus rapids ride and a pair of twisted airtime hills with a tunnel in between. Another airtime hill leads into a shallow double up and into a turnaround, passing through a faux billboard in the process. The coaster maneuvers over and under itself in a series of twists, and then ascends its second lift.

The train is propelled up to a height of  via a drive tire lift, and a switch track hastily diverts the train into an indoor show scene, depicting the temple of Medusa. A projection mapping sequence ensures, whereas Medusa is evidently displeased at trespassers in her temple and prepares to turn the riders to stone. The train is suddenly launched backwards and blow past the lift hill, descending a curved drop and speeding along a series of low-ground twists over the Romus et Rapidus, before hitting the final brake run. The coaster train backs up and a switch track enables riders to travel forwards once again, where a final 180° left hand turn leads to the final holding brake before the station. The ride experience lasts approximately 3 minutes.

References

External links
Pégase Express at Gerstlauer

Roller coasters in France